Tom Ingram (born 20 August 1993) is a British racing driver, currently racing in the British Touring Car Championship. Having won the Ginetta Junior Championship in 2010 and the G50 class of the Ginetta GT Supercup in 2011, Ingram was named a British Racing Drivers' Club Rising Star in 2011. He won his first BTCC race at the first round of the 2016 season at Brands Hatch. Ingram is the 2022 British Touring Car champion.

Karting

2001 
Born in High Wycombe, Ingram started his racing career at the age of 8, karting in the Open Cadet Class. In his first 5 races, he came 3rd once and won 4 novice awards, racing in the Formula 6, Buckmore Park and Bayfords Meadows Summer Championships. In the winter of that same year, Ingram also competed in the Sandown Park Kart Club Championship and finished 2nd. In his second year of the Open Cadet karts, he won 8 of the 12 races in Formula 6, and 6 of the 8 rounds in the Bayford Meadows Summer Championship winning both championships. He also set 3 lap records at 3 different circuits.

2002 

In September 2002 he stepped up to the F6 Honda Cadet Championship and the Bayford Meadows Winter Championship and won all 3 races and the championship.

2003 

In 2003 he took delivery of a brand new Project One Honda Cadet chassis and used this for the rest of the season which was the National "O" plate finishing 3rd overall he also won the Lydd Championship and came second in both the Bayford Meadows and Buckmore Park Club Championships. He also finished 3rd in the Formula 6 Championship.

2004 

Later in 2004 Ingram contested in the Super 2 National Championship and the Formula 6 Championship. He finished 2nd in the F6 and 6th in the National 4 stroke Championships. In October 2004 he changed classes to 2 stroke Rotax Minimax using a Tonykart Chassis (the minimax is a class that uses an adult sized chassis and 125cc water cooled 2-stroke Rotax engine).

2005 

In 2005 Ingram managed to finish 3rd in the Buckmore Park winter championship, 4th in the Bayford Meadows Winter Championship and 1st in the Lydd Winter Championships. He also finished 2nd in both Buckmore Park and Bayford Meadows Summer Championships and gained many other notable results in the year including 2nd in The Brazilian Cup and 1st in the Renault Champion of Champions meeting his first major win.

2006 

In 2006 Ingram won his first ever British Championship which was The BRDC Minimax Stars of Tomorrow Championship. 2006 also saw Ingram compete in the Super 1 British Kart Championship, but a bad accident in the second round saw him hospitalised and out of the championship. Ingram was voted local Sports Personality of the year.

2007 

2007 saw Ingram compete in the BRDC Stars of Tomorrow Junior Max Championship, in which he finished 8th. He also won the Brazilian Cup at Whilton Mill. Ingram was voted local Sports Personality for the Year for the second year in a row.

2008 

In Ingram's final year in Karts he competed in every major competition in the UK including Stars of Tomorrow, Super 1, Kartmasters but struggled with finances and missed some of the rounds.

Motor racing

2009 

In Ingram's debut season in cars he competed in the Ginetta Junior Championship, which is a one-make support championship for young drivers between 14-17 year olds on the BTCC (British Touring Car Championship) package, racing Ginetta G20s. He finished 12th in the championship after missing 6 rounds due to funding issues. He managed to get onto the podium in his second race as well as getting 2 pole positions and 5 top 5 finishes.

2010 

2010 saw Ingram win the Ginetta Junior Championship with the Hillspeed team getting 13 podiums, 8 fastest laps, 5 wins and 6 pole positions. For this year, the old Ginetta G20 had been replaced by the new Ginetta G40.
As a prize for winning the championship Ingram had a full day's testing with Pirtek British Touring Car team finishing the day just half a second off the time set by Andrew Jordan set in the morning. During the winter of 2010 Ingram made it into the final four of the Formula Renault Racing Steps Foundation Scholarship.

2011 

In 2011 Ingram became a BRDC Rising Star. Despite limited testing he won the Ginetta GT Supercup championship driving for Plans Motorsport in a Ginetta G50 with two rounds to spare; he managed to pick up 10 wins and a total of 18 podiums, 13 fastest laps and 13 pole positions starts. Ingram also made it into the final four of the Porsche Supercup Scholarship.

2012 

2012 saw Ingram compete in the Ginetta G55 class of the Ginetta GT Supercup racing for JHR Developments, Ingram won Jason Plato's newly launched KX Academy scholarship and secures funding and mentoring for the rest of the season. During this season Ingram had 6 wins, 17 podiums, finished 3rd in the championship. Ingram was voted Radio Le Mans Young Driver of the Year.

2013 

For 2013, Ingram remained with JHR Developments in his Ginetta G55 in the Ginetta GT Supercup.
Ingram was invited to drive a MG ZR 190 for MG dealer Brown & Gammons at the MG Live event at Silverstone. He qualified on pole, and won race 1 by over 6 seconds, also taking the fastest lap. In race 2, he won by almost 16 seconds and took the fastest lap again.

Ingram finished the season as the 2013 Ginetta GT Supercup Champion with 22 consecutive podiums, 11 wins, nine 2nds, two 3rds, five poles and 15 fastest laps.

Ingram was the only member of Jason Plato's KX academy to win a championship and remains very proud of this achievement.

2014 
Ingram made his debut in the British Touring Car Championship, driving for Speedworks Motorsport in their Toyota Avensis. Despite this being one of the first NGTC cars Ingram made some good progress with 13 top ten finishes.

2015 
Ingram re-signed for Speedworks Motorsports in their very heavily revised Toyota Avensis. In race three at Rockingham Ingram secured his first ever podium after a titanic battle with his former mentor Jason Plato and despite swapping the lead on a couple of occasions he finished a very emotional 2nd. This race was voted by the fans as the best race of the season. In the season finale Ingram secured his second podium with another 2nd place.

2016 
Ingram re-signed for Speedworks Motorsports in the Toyota Avensis and at the Brands Hatch Indy circuit he qualified on pole for the first race of the season setting a new Touring Car lap record of 47.994 and then went on to secure his first British Touring Car Championship race win. He also secured his first Independents Cup race win.

In the second meeting at Donington Park Ingram secured his second podium of the year with a 3rd place in race one.

2017 

Racing with Speedworks again in 2017, he topped the timesheets at pre-season testing with his Toyota. Ingram took second place on the grid for the first race of the 2017 season at Brands Hatch, and went on to win the opening race of the season as he had in 2016. However, in the second race his car twice failed to start, and Ingram would have taken a drive through penalty had the race not been red flagged for a crash involving Jason Plato. Struggling with his car due to the ballast on his car, Ingram finished third behind Gordon Shedden and Rob Collard. He became the first driver to score two race wins in 2017 after winning Race 2 at Donington Park. After Race 3 he was 4 points behind Gordon Shedden in the championship, but Shedden was later excluded from the results leaving Ingram in the championship lead.

2018
Ingram continued to race for Speedworks in 2018, going into the final round at Brands Hatch with an outside chance of winning the championship, starting the day 33 points behind championship leader Colin Turkington. Race 1 saw Turkington extend his championship lead to 36 points. Fighting back in Race 2 Ingram went from 14th to 4th, despite Turkington slipping down the order, it wasn’t enough to claim the overall title. Ingram carried on to win the 2018 Independents’ title for a 2nd year in a row.

2019

Starting a new chapter with Speedworks 2019 saw the birth of the brand new Toyota Corolla and the team changing into a manufacturer. The new car looked fantastic straight out on the box and in only its 6th race Tom took the new car to its 1st of 4 wins that year and this win was in front of 4000 employees from the nearby Toyota factory. Developing this new car was made harder as it was a single car team but the team were more than capable of getting on top of some of the early handling issues and by the end of the season the car was looking a lot more stable.

2020

After a good development year with the new car Ingram stayed with Speedworks for the 7th consecutive year, during the winter the team was very busy developing lots of refinements and the car was a real improvement on last years car. Ingram had 3 wins and a total of 11 podiums with 4 non scores Ingram was still in the title shootout at the season finale.

2021

The 2021 season would see the end of an Ingram's impressive run with Speedworks, with the driver and team parting ways due to conflicting requirements of sponsors.  Ingram went on to sign with EXCELR8 Trade Price Cars, driving their Hyundai i30 Fastback.

Racing record

Career summary 

* Season still in progress.

Complete British Touring Car Championship results 
(key) Races in bold indicate pole position (1 point awarded – just in first race) Races in italics indicate fastest lap (1 point awarded) * signifies that driver lead race for at least one lap (1 point awarded)

* Season still in progress.

Complete GT Cup Championship results
(key) (Races in bold indicate pole position in class – 1 point awarded just in first race; races in italics indicate fastest lap in class – 1 point awarded all races;-

† Ingram was ineligible for points as he was an invitation entry.

References

External links

1993 births
Living people
British racing drivers
24H Series drivers
Ginetta GT4 Supercup drivers
Ginetta Junior Championship drivers
Toyota Gazoo Racing drivers
British Touring Car Championship drivers
British Touring Car Championship Champions
JHR Developments drivers